Fray Luis Beltrán is a small city in the , located within the metropolitan area of Greater Rosario, north of the city of Rosario, on the western shore of the Paraná River.

The town was founded in 1892 by Domingo Borghi. Its name is an homage to a friar of the San Carlos Monastery in nearby San Lorenzo, where the wounded of the rebel forces of General José de San Martín were tended after the Battle of San Lorenzo.

Fray Luis Beltrán is divided into two parts by the National Route 11. There is a military battalion, a factory of weapons and military supplies (Fábrica Militar Fray Luis Beltrán ), and a chemical plant (Sulfacid S. A.).

References
 
 

Cities in Argentina
Populated places in Santa Fe Province